The 2007 Algiers bombings occurred on 11 April 2007 when two suicide car bombs exploded in the Algerian capital Algiers.

The headquarters of the Algerian prime minister were hit by a large explosion that left many people dead and injured and could be heard 10 km away. Another explosion targeted a police station in an eastern suburb of the city, near the international airport.

Al-Qaeda claimed responsibility for the bombings after the attack took place.

Details and context of the bombings
The first attack, which was on the prime minister's office, killed 12 people and injured 118, and the second attack on the police station in the Bab Ezzouar district of Algiers killed 11 and injured 44.
The Al-Qaeda group in the Maghreb is the group claiming responsibility for these two attacks. This group was formerly known as the Salafist Group for Preaching and Combat (GSPC).

The United Nations Security Council held an official meeting to condemn the attacks.
The attack was planned by Sofiane el-Fassila.

See also
 Algerian Civil War
 Terrorist bombings in Algeria

References

External links
 Explosions rock Algerian capital
 In pictures: Algerian blasts (BBC)

Mass murder in 2007
History of Algiers
Terrorist incidents in Algeria in 2007
Terrorist incidents in Algeria
Suicide car and truck bombings in Algeria
21st century in Algiers
Crime in Algiers
April 2007 events in Africa
2007 murders in Algeria
Islamic terrorism in Algeria
Islamic terrorist incidents in 2007
Terrorist incidents attributed to al-Qaeda in the Islamic Maghreb